Jordan Owens (born May 1, 1986) is a retired Canadian professional ice hockey left winger. He recently played with the Melbourne Mustangs of the Australian Ice Hockey League (AIHL).

Career
On June 12, 2007, Owens was signed as an undrafted free agent to an entry level contract with the New York Rangers. In his fourth season within the Rangers organization on March 3, 2010, he was traded to the Detroit Red Wings in exchange for Kris Newbury.

On August 1, 2014, Owen opted to venture overseas for a second time in his career in agreeing to a one-year contract with WSV Sterzing Broncos of the Italian Elite.A.

After a stint in the DEL with Fischtown Pinguins, Owens moved to the Sheffield Steelers of the United Kingdom's Elite Ice Hockey League in July 2018.

Career statistics

References

External links

1986 births
Living people
Black Canadian ice hockey players
Canadian ice hockey left wingers
Charlotte Checkers (1993–2010) players
Connecticut Whale (AHL) players
Fischtown Pinguins players
Grand Rapids Griffins players
Hamilton Bulldogs (AHL) players
Hartford Wolf Pack players
Mississauga IceDogs players
Sheffield Steelers players
SønderjyskE Ishockey players
South Carolina Stingrays players
Ice hockey people from Toronto
Wipptal Broncos players
Melbourne Mustangs players
Canadian expatriate ice hockey players in England
Canadian expatriate ice hockey players in Denmark
Canadian expatriate ice hockey players in Germany